Gris-gris (also spelled grigri, and sometimes also "gregory" or "gerregery") is a Voodoo amulet originating in Africa which is believed to protect the wearer from evil or bring luck, and in some West African countries is used as a supposed method of birth control. It consists of a small cloth bag, usually inscribed with verses from an African ancestor containing a ritual number of small objects, worn on the person.

Etymology
Although the exact origins of the word are unknown, some historians trace the word back to the Yoruba word juju meaning fetish. An alternative theory is that the word originates with the French joujou meaning doll or play-thing. It has otherwise been attributed in scholarly sources to the Mandingo word meaning "magic".

History
The gris-gris originated in Dagomba in Ghana and was associated with Islamic traditions. Originally the gris-gris was adorned with Islamic scripture and was used to ward off evil spirits (evil djinn) or bad luck. Historians of the time noted that they were frequently worn by non-believers and believers alike, and were also found attached to buildings.

Spread
The practice of using gris-gris, though originating in Africa, came to the United States with enslaved Africans and was quickly adopted by practitioners of Voodoo.

However, the practice soon changed, and the gris-gris were thought to bring black magic upon their "victim." Slaves would often use the gris-gris against their owners and some can still be seen adorning their tombs. During this period, there were also reports of slaves cutting, drowning or otherwise manipulating the gris-gris of others in order to cause harm. Although in Haiti, gris-gris are thought to be a good amulet and are used as part of a widely practised religion; in the Cajun communities of Louisiana, gris-gris are thought to be a symbol of black magic and ill-fortune.

In spite of the negative connotations of gris-gris, so-called Gris-Gris doctors have operated in the Creole communities of Louisiana for some centuries and are looked upon favourably by the community. In the 1800s, gris-gris was used interchangeably in Louisiana to mean both bewitch and in reference to the traditional amulet.

Further uses
Gris-gris are also used in Neo-Hoodoo which has its origins in Voodoo. In this context, a gris-gris is meant to represent the self.

Contemporary use
According to a 1982 survey, gris-gris were one of the top three methods of contraception known to women in Senegal. All three were traditional methods ("abstinence, roots and herbs, and charms ['gris-gris']"). Over 60% of women reported having knowledge of such traditional methods; modern means of contraception were not well known, with the pill the best-known of those, a little over 40% of women reporting knowledge of it. Gris-gris are worn by a wide strata of society by everyone "from wrestlers to soldiers to housewives, and can feature anything from monkey to snake to mouse."

See also
 Haitian Vodou
 Louisiana Voodoo
 Mojo (African-American culture)
 Hoodoo (folk magic)
 Witchcraft
 Medicine bag
 Sacred bundle
 Omamori
 Ta'wiz

References

Voodoo
Amulets
Talismans
Superstitions of Africa